Rijad Kobiljar (born 8 April 1996) is a Bosnian professional footballer who plays as a midfielder for Bosnian Premier League club Sarajevo.

Honours
Zrinjski Mostar
Bosnian Premier League: 2016–17

References

External links

1996 births
Living people
Footballers from Sarajevo
Bosnia and Herzegovina footballers
Association football midfielders
Bosnia and Herzegovina under-21 international footballers
Bosnia and Herzegovina expatriate footballers
FK Sarajevo players
NK Travnik players
FK Olimpik players
HŠK Zrinjski Mostar players
NK GOŠK Gabela players
NK Olimpija Ljubljana (2005) players
NK Rudar Velenje players
KFC Uerdingen 05 players
Premier League of Bosnia and Herzegovina players
Slovenian PrvaLiga players
3. Liga players
Bosnia and Herzegovina expatriate sportspeople in the United States
Bosnia and Herzegovina expatriate sportspeople in Slovenia
Bosnia and Herzegovina expatriate sportspeople in Germany
Expatriate soccer players in the United States
Expatriate footballers in Slovenia
Expatriate footballers in Germany